South Dakota Highway 38 (SD 38) is a  state highway in southeastern South Dakota, United States, that runs from Mitchell to Sioux Falls.

Route description

SD 38 begins at an intersection with a business loop of I-90 (Burr Street) along Havens Street in Mitchell. It runs east and leaves the city of Mitchell, then crosses the James River. As it crosses the river, the highway leaves Davison County and enters Hanson County. The route continues east, roughly paralleling I-90 to the north. It passes south of Fulton and then intersects SD 25. SD 38 then curves slightly to the north and enters McCook County. Later, it passes through Salem and intersects U.S. Route 81 (US 81). East of Salem, the highway curves to the southeast and passes through the southeastern corner of the city of Montrose. The route then bends further to the southeast and enters Minnehaha County.

The two routes run together through the northern part of Humboldt, where SD 19 splits off to the north and SD 38 continues east toward Hartford. Once it reaches Hartford, the highway bends to the southeast. Southeast of the city, SD 38 shares a folded diamond interchange with I-90. After this interchange, SD 38 curves to the east and enters Sioux Falls. About  farther east, SD 38 meets its eastern terminus at another folded diamond interchange with I-29.

Major intersections

Related route

See also

 List of state highways in South Dakota

References

External links

038
Transportation in Sioux Falls, South Dakota
Transportation in Davison County, South Dakota
Transportation in Hanson County, South Dakota
Transportation in McCook County, South Dakota